Colea Răutu (18 November 1912 – 13 May 2008) was a Romanian actor, born in Bălți (Russian Empire, now Republic of Moldova). He played in more than fifty movies and TV series, among other the western film Apachen, the Romanian TV series Toate pînzele sus, and the prize-winning film Răscoala.

Selected filmography 
 La 'Moara cu noroc' (1955) (The Mill of Good Luck) Nominated for the "Golden Palm" at the 1957 Cannes Film Festival.
 Setea (1960) (Thirst) Awarded the "Silver Prize" at the 1960 Moscow International Film Festival, and nominated for the "Grand Prix" at the same festival.
 Thirst (1961)
 Lupeni 29 (1962)
 Răscoala (1965) Blazing Winter or Flaming Winter or The Uprising. Won the prize for "Best First Work" at the 1966 Cannes Film Festival, and nominated for the "Golden Palm".
 Mihai Viteazul (1970) (Last Crusade) Nominated for the Golden Prize at the 7th Moscow International Film Festival.
 Apachen (1973)
 Explozia (1973) (The Poseidon Explosion) Nominated for the Golden Prize at the 8th Moscow International Film Festival.
 Ultimul cartuş (1973)
 Ulzana (1974)
 Toate pînzele sus (1976)
 Accident (1976)
Mihail, câine de circ (1979)
 Duelul (1981) (The Duel): Nominated as "Best film" for the 1982 Mystfest festival (International Mystery Film Festival of Cattolica).
 The Last Assault (1985)
 Mircea (1989)
 Iubire ca-n filme (2006) - Bogdan's father

References 

1912 births
2008 deaths
People from Bălți
Romanian people of Moldovan descent
Romanian male stage actors
Romanian male film actors
Romanian male television actors
Romanian vaudeville performers
20th-century Romanian male actors
Knights of the Order of the Star of Romania
Burials at Bellu Cemetery